Ouro Fino is a city situated in the state of Minas Gerais in the Southeastern Region of Brazil.

See also
List of municipalities in Minas Gerais

References

Municipalities in Minas Gerais